The men's marathon event at the 2002 Commonwealth Games was held on 28 July.

Results

References
Official results
Results at BBC

Marathon
2002
Commonwealth
2002 Commonwealth Games